Chase Allen may refer to:
 Chase Allen (linebacker) (born 1993), American football linebacker
 Chase Allen (tight end) (born 1997), American football tight end